W. R. Grace and Co. is an American chemical business based in Columbia, Maryland. It produces specialty chemicals and specialty materials in two divisions: Grace Catalysts Technologies, which makes catalysts and related products and technologies used in petrochemical, refining, and other chemical manufacturing applications, and Grace Materials and Chemicals, which makes specialty materials, including silica-based and silica-alumina-based materials, used in pharmaceutical/consumer, coatings, and chemical process applications.

For much of its early history, Grace's main business was in South America, in maritime shipping, railroads, agriculture, and silver mining, with 30,000 employees in Peru. In the 1950s, Grace began to diversify and grew into a Fortune 100 worldwide conglomerate. After emerging from a prolonged bankruptcy period of 12 years in 2014, the company spun off its other major operating divisions. In September 2021, Standard Industries acquired the company.

History
The company was founded in 1854 in Peru by William Russell Grace at the age of 22. Grace left Ireland during the Great Famine and traveled to South America with his family. He went first to Peru to work as a ship chandler for the firm of Bryce and Company, to the merchantmen harvesting guano, used as a fertilizer and gunpowder ingredient due to its high levels of phosphorus and nitrogen.

His brother, Michael P. Grace, joined the business, and in 1865 the company name was changed to Grace Brothers & Co. The company set up head office operations in New York City in 1865. Working in fertilizer and machinery, the company was formally chartered in 1872 and incorporated in 1895.

In 1904, Michael P. Grace became president after the death of William Grace.

The company expanded, creating business divisions including Grace Shipping, Grace Cruise Lines, Grace Petroleum, Grace Drilling, and Grace Healthcare. Grace acquired and combined other companies to create and expand businesses such as Barilla Pasta, FAO Schwarz, Ingersoll-Rand, Roto-Rooter, Del Taco, and Cartavio Distilleries.

In 1914, it created Grace National Bank.

In 1945, the founder's grandson, J. Peter Grace, became president. Under his leadership, the company owned the country's largest oil-drilling fleet, ran the world's largest cattle ranch and the world's largest cocoa bean company; sugar plantations in Peru; cotton mills in Chile; silver, clay, phosphate, and tin mines; and processed rare earths for the US nuclear arms program. Grace owned a food group that operated 900 chain restaurant locations, and a retail division with chains for sporting goods, home improvement, jewelry, aftermarket automotive parts, and leather goods. The company operated fertilizer companies, confectioners, and beverage companies, including Miller Brewing. Grace pioneered genetic engineering at its Agricetus division in Wisconsin, and human gene therapy at its Aurigent Pharmaceuticals group. The company constructed a 160-acre research complex, the Washington Research Center, in Columbia, Maryland. It also commissioned the New York City skyscraper, the W. R. Grace Building, as its world headquarters, in midtown Manhattan, from where it directed worldwide operations, including Grace Container Products.

In 1953, the company became a public company via an initial public offering on the New York Stock Exchange. In 1954, the company acquired Davison Chemical Company and Dewey & Almy Chemical Company, entering the specialty chemicals and specialty materials industries and establishing the basis for the current product lines.

In 1987, Grace built a can sealant plant in Minhing, China, near Shanghai, thereby becoming the first wholly foreign-owned, private company to do business in The People's Republic of China.

In February 2016, Grace completed the corporate spin-off of GCP Applied Technologies.

In July 2016, the company acquired a catalysts business from BASF.

In June 2021, the company acquired a unit from Albemarle Corporation.

In September 2021, Standard Industries acquired the company.

Incorporation
There are two accounts of the incorporation date of W. R. Grace & Co. According to The New York Times, the company was incorporated as part of the estate and successor planning, in 1895. The three brothers consolidated most of their holdings into a new private company, incorporated in West Virginia, called W. R. Grace & Company. The consolidation involved W. R. Grace & Co. of New York, Grace Brothers & Co. of Lima, Peru, Grace & Co. of Valparaiso Chile, William R. Grace & Co. of London, and J. W. Grace & Co of San Francisco.

According to its website, W. R. Grace & Co. was incorporated in Connecticut in 1899. The listed capital of $6 million did not include Grace Brothers & Co. Limited in London or its branches in San Francisco, Lima, and Callao, Peru, nor Valparaiso, Santiago, and Concepción, Chile.

J. Louis Schaefer, who joined the company as a boy, played a key role in not only W. R. Grace & Company, in which he became a vice president, but also as president of Grace National Bank. Schaefer was a co-executor of the estate of Michael Grace with William's son and corporate successor, Joseph Peter Grace, Sr. J. Louis Schaefer died in 1927.

Shipping

For most of its history, Grace's main business was cargo shipping, operating the Grace Line. To get cargo from Peru to North America and Europe, including guano and sugar, and noticing the need for other goods to be traded, William Grace founded a shipping division. Grace Line began service in 1882, with ports of call between Peru and New York. Regular steamship service was established in 1893, with a subsidiary called the New York & Pacific Steamship Co., that operated under the British flag. Ships built outside the United States before 1905 were banned from the US registry. US-flag service began in 1912 with the Atlantic and Pacific Steamship Company. The activities of both companies and the parent firm were consolidated into the Grace Steamship Company beginning in 1916. The firm originally specialized in traffic to the west coast of South America; then later expanded into the Caribbean.

In 1916, Grace acquired a controlling interest in the Pacific Mail Steamship Company. In 1921, Pacific received five 535 ft. President class ships from the United States Shipping Board for transpacific operation. In 1923, the US Shipping board decided to place the five ships up for bid and Dollar Shipping Company won the bid. With no large ships for the transpacific operations, Grace sold the Pacific Mail, its registered name, and goodwill to Dollar. Now without a transpacific service, Grace did not need the six intercoastal freighters and sold them to the American Hawaiian Line. At this time, Grace formed the Panama Mail Steamship Company, to operate the smaller ships that were formerly owned and used by the Pacific Mail in the Central American trade. These ships were not involved in the sale to Dollar.

On the death of William R. Grace in 1904, he was succeeded by William L. Sauders as company president followed by Joseph Peter Grace, Sr. (1872–1950) who became president in 1907. In 1938 the Colombian Line merged with Grace Line bringing an end to the Colombian Line. During World War II, Grace Lines operated transport for the U.S. War Shipping Administration, including the SS Sea Marlin.

J. Peter Grace took over management of the company after his father suffered a stroke in 1945. After the war, the Grace line operated 23 ships totaling 188,000 gross tons, and an additional 14 more on bareboat charters. In 1954 the company bought Davison Chemical Company (founded by William T. Davison as Davison, Kettlewell & Company in 1832), and the Dewey & Almy Chemical Company (founded in 1919 by Bradley Dewey and Charles Almy).

In 1960 Grace Line, inspired by the pioneering efforts of Sea-Land Service, Matson Navigation, and Seatrain Lines, sought to begin containerizing its South American cargo operations by converting the conventional freighters Santa Eliana and Santa Leonor into fully cellular container ships. However, the effort was stymied by the opposition of longshoremen in New York and Venezuela, and the ships were repeatedly laid up idle and were ultimately sold to the domestic container line Sea-Land Service in 1964. In 1963 Grace made a second attempt to containerize its South American trade when it ordered the four M-class combination passenger-cargo ships Santa Magdalaena, Santa Maria, Santa Mariana, and Santa Mercedes with partial cellular holds, but they were no more successful as mixing conventional break-bulk cargo and containers in the same ship negated the operating economies that full containerization promised.

In 1966, the company bought a 53% controlling stake in Miller Brewing for $36 million from Lorraine Mulberger, the granddaughter of Frederick Miller, who sold the stake for religious reasons. The company sold the Miller stake in 1969 to Philip Morris for $130 million, after first cancelling an agreed-upon sale to PepsiCo for $120 million. This resulted in a lawsuit.

In 1970, Grace Line was sold to Prudential Lines for $44.5 million, with the merged company renamed Prudential Grace Line. It was taken over by Delta Steamship Lines in 1978, thereby extinguishing the name Grace in ocean shipping. Subsequently, Delta Steamship Lines was acquired and consolidated by Crowley Maritime in 1982.

Property nationalized
In 1974, the Peruvian government nationalized properties in Peru owned by the company. Harold Logan, Grace's executive vice president, stated the company would join in governmental-level talks over compensation of expropriated American concerns. The loss of Grace's properties in Peru began in 1969 when 25,000 acres of sugarcane plantations were taken over in agrarian reform. The sugar lands were at Paramonga, 110 miles north of Lima, and at Cartavio, near Trujillo, 200 miles farther up the coast. Grace retained small mining operations producing copper, tin, and silver, in southern Peru, about 100 miles north of Juliaca. Jose E. Flores, head of W. R. Grace S.A. Peru, closed the mining operations for Grace in Latin America when the government of Peru nationalized the remaining interests.

Airline
In 1928, Grace and Pan American Airways jointly formed Pan American-Grace Airways known as Panagra, establishing the first air link between North and South America, which began operation in 1929.

Retail
Prior to 1985, W. R. Grace operated a retail division. Among its ownings were Handy City home improvement stores, Home Quarters Warehouse, J. B. Robinson Jewelers, Sheplers Western Wear, and Herman's World of Sporting Goods which it had acquired in 1970. These were sold to various buyers in 1985.

Headquarters
The company has its headquarters in Columbia, MD, an unincorporated census-designated place in Howard County, Maryland. Although W. R. Grace commissioned the W. R. Grace Building in New York City, built in 1971, the company no longer has any offices at that location.

Previously, the company had its headquarters in Boca Raton, Florida. Prior to its closing, the Boca Raton headquarters had about 130 employees. On January 27, 1999, it announced it was moving its administrative staff to the Columbia office and closing the Boca Raton headquarters. About 40 of the employees went to Columbia, and some employees went to Cambridge, Massachusetts. In 2014, the company emerged from a 13-year bankruptcy case stemming from asbestos claims and immediately built a new 90,000 sq ft headquarters building on its 160-acre Columbia campus.

Contamination incidents
The company has been involved in several controversial incidents of proven and alleged corporate crimes, including exposing workers and residents of an entire town to asbestos contamination in Libby and Troy, Montana, water contamination (the basis of the book and film A Civil Action) in Woburn, Massachusetts, and an Acton, Massachusetts, Superfund site.

Asbestos
While Grace no longer makes asbestos or related products, at the time of its bankruptcy in 2001 it faced over 65,000 asbestos-related personal injury lawsuits involving over 129,000 claims.

On April 2, 2001, Grace and its subsidiaries in the United States filed voluntary petitions for Chapter 11 Bankruptcy reorganization in the Bankruptcy Court for the District of Delaware. The company was trying to find a resolution through federal court-supervised reorganization in response to the quickly growing number of asbestos-related bodily injury claims.

On September 19, 2008, Grace filed a revised plan of reorganization to the same court, jointly with the asbestos injury claimants. In January 2011, the court issued an order in favor of the new plan and in January 2012, the court denied all appeals and affirmed the plan. After a motion for reconsideration, the plan was reaffirmed on June 11, 2012.

On February 3, 2014, Grace emerged from the asbestos-related Chapter 11 bankruptcy, which took more than 12 years. Under the plan of reorganization approved by the court, all parties filings the asbestos-related claims were to direct their inquiry to either an asbestos personal injury trust or a separate asbestos property damage trust.

In popular culture
 The movie A Civil Action, starring John Travolta, was based on the Grace groundwater contamination lawsuits in Woburn, Massachusetts.
 The PBS television show P.O.V., which highlights independent films, in August 2007 premiered the movie Libby, Montana which documents the thousands of people in Libby, Montana, that have been exposed to and are suffering the effects of asbestos exposure. The show also discusses the criminal indictments of many Grace executives for covering up asbestos related illnesses and deaths.
 PBS also aired Dust to Dust, a documentary produced by Michael Brown Productions, Inc. in 2002. "Dust to Dust" reports on the more than 200 people who have died from asbestos exposure in Libby, Montana. The film focuses on the plights of several of these individuals and the damage done over almost 30 years while the mine was operated by W. R. Grace.
 NPR aired a piece on All Things Considered discussing the criminal charges against W. R. Grace. A U.S. attorney general alleges that the company and managers of the mine in Libby, Montana, knew about the dangers of the asbestos they were dumping into the air for over 20 years.
 On February 19, 2008, the NPR-produced radio show Here and Now broadcast a story about the film Libby, Montana, which details the asbestos contamination in the town of that name.
 On April 22, 2009, the television and radio program Democracy Now! broadcast two segments on the trial of W. R. Grace and some of its employees related to the asbestos contamination in Libby, Montana. Democracy Now! also broadcast a follow-up interview on May 12, 2009. This interview focused on reactions to the not-guilty verdict in the federal trial, where W. R. Grace and three former executives were acquitted on charges of knowingly exposing workers and townspeople to asbestos, and subsequently participating in a cover-up.

Neem patent
In 1995, the European Patent Office (EPO) granted a patent on an anti-fungal product derived from the neem tree to the United States Department of Agriculture and W. R. Grace. The Indian government challenged the patent when it was granted, claiming that the process for which the patent had been granted had been in use in India for more than 2,000 years. In 2000, the EPO ruled in India's favour, but W. R. Grace appealed, claiming that prior art about the product had never been published in a scientific journal. On March 8, 2005, that appeal was lost and the EPO revoked the Neem patent.

See also

 Anderson v. Cryovac
 Beatrice Foods
 Grace Institute

References

External links
 

1854 establishments in Peru
 
American corporate subsidiaries
Chemical companies of the United States
Companies based in Columbia, Maryland
Companies formerly listed on the New York Stock Exchange
Companies of Peru
Companies that filed for Chapter 11 bankruptcy in 2001
Conglomerate companies of the United States
Manufacturing companies based in Maryland
Manufacturing companies established in 1854
Shipping companies of the United States
Specialty chemical companies
2021 mergers and acquisitions